The Limmat is a river in Switzerland. The river commences at the outfall of Lake Zurich, in the southern part of the city of Zurich. From Zurich it flows in a northwesterly direction, after 35 km reaching the river Aare. The confluence is located north of the small town of Brugg and shortly after the mouth of the Reuss.

The main towns along the Limmat Valley downstream of Zurich are Dietikon, Wettingen, and Baden. Its main tributaries are the Linth, via Lake Zurich, the Sihl, in Zurich, and the Reppisch, in Dietikon.

The hydronym is first attested in the 8th century, as Lindimacus. It is of Gaulish origin, from *lindo- "lake" (Welsh llyn) and *magos "plain" (Welsh maes), and was thus presumably in origin the name of the plain formed by the Linth.

Power generation 
These include:

Navigation 
Historically, the Limmat was an important navigation route. In the twelfth and thirteenth centuries, voyages from Zurich to Koblenz are recorded. In 1447, the Emperor Frederick III granted the privilege of free navigation on the Limmat and on the Rhine to Zurich. Because of the current, navigation was typically downstream only, with the barges being sold on arrival.

Today, the Limmat is navigable for much of its length by small craft only, with many of the hydroelectric power plants incorporating boat lifts.

The uppermost stretch of the river through the centre of Zurich is navigable by rather larger vessels, albeit limited by low bridges. On this stretch of the river the Zürichsee-Schifffahrtsgesellschaft (Lake Zurich Navigation Company) operates its Limmat boat service, from the Landesmuseum to Lake Zurich, using low-profile motor boats.

Towns near the river 
In the canton of Zurich:
Zurich
Oberengstringen
Unterengstringen
Schlieren
Dietikon
Geroldswil
Oetwil an der Limmat
In the canton of Aargau
Spreitenbach
Würenlos
Neuenhof
Wettingen
Baden
Ennetbaden
Nussbaumen AG
Untersiggenthal
Turgi

Cultural Heritage 
Located on the swamp land between Limmat and Zürichsee around Sechseläutenplatz on small islands and peninsulas in Zürich, Prehistoric pile dwellings around Zürichsee were set on piles to protect against occasional flooding by the Linth and Jona. Zürich–Enge Alpenquai is located on Zürichsee lakeshore in Enge, a locality of the municipality of Zürich. As well as being part of the 56 Swiss sites of the UNESCO World Heritage Site Prehistoric pile dwellings around the Alps, the settlement is also listed in the Swiss inventory of cultural property of national and regional significance as a Class object.

References

External links 
 
 
 

 
Rivers of Switzerland
Geography of Zürich
Rivers of the canton of Zürich